In mathematics, and particularly functional analysis, the Helly space, named after Eduard Helly, consists of all monotonically increasing functions , where [0,1] denotes the closed interval given by the set of all x such that  In other words, for all  we have  and also if  then 

Let the closed interval [0,1] be denoted simply by I. We can form the space II by taking the uncountable Cartesian product of closed intervals:

The space II is exactly the space of functions . For each point x in [0,1] we assign the point ƒ(x) in

Topology 

The Helly space is a subset of II. The space II has its own topology, namely the product topology. The Helly space has a topology; namely the induced topology as a subset of II. It is normal Haudsdorff, compact, separable, and first-countable but not second-countable.

References 

Functional analysis

Gelfand–Shilov space